Totchtawan Sripan or formerly Tawan Sripan nickname Ban is a Thai professional football manager and a former footballer. He is the current interim manager of Thai League 1 club Bangkok United.

Playing career
Totchtawan became one of the greatest midfielders in Thailand with his creative passing and set-piece taking. He won the award from Cheerthai.com, the main website for Thai football in 2001, for the best player of that year. His most voted memorable goals for the Thailand national team came from a friendly match against Manchester United in 2001 and a 30-yard free-kick against Holland in a friendly match in Bangkok in 2007, which Thailand lost 1–3.

Totchtawan announced his retirement after Thailand national football team failed to qualify for the World cup 2010. Thereafter, he was appointed as Thailand assistant coach by the Football Association of Thailand for cooperation working with Peter Reid who was appointed Thailand chief coach in August.

In November 2008, Tawan stood down from his duties as the assistant coach with the Thai national team, due to some players being unhappy with his other commitments to his club side BEC Tero Sasana (Tawan was still actively playing). Tawan's role as assistant coach to Reid saw the national team win one game and lose one game: beating North Korea in the opening game of the T&T Cup and losing away to Saudi Arabia.

During his career, playing for clubs in Thailand, Vietnam and Singapore, he played as central midfielder or attacking midfielder. Totchtawan was a longstanding member of the Thailand national team, playing from 1992 to 2009.

Managerial career

BEC Tero Sasana
May 2009, After parting way with Christophe Larrouilh in the middle of the season, BEC Tero Sasana decided to promote Tawan Sripan to be the player-coach of the club. Sripan managed the club to finish in the fourth place of the table and reach the final of 2009 FA Cup. BEC Tero lost in the final against Thai Port by the penalty shoot-out after the 1–1 draw at the end of the extra-time.

Saraburi

In December 2010, Totchtawan joined his hometown club Saraburi when the club was still in the Regional League Division 2, the third level division. He spent his first year by promoting his club from the Division 2 to Division 1. His debut was the game in Division 1 Promotion stage against Rangsit University which Saraburi won 2–0. Saraburi promoted to Division 1 by finishing third place in group A of the qualification. Saraburi stayed in Thai second division for four years before the historic promotion. Saraburi promoted to Thai Premier League after the finished as the runner-up in the end of 2014 season.

Totchtawan continued his head coach role in 2015 Thai Premier League. However, Saruburi could collect only one point after six games of the season. Totchtawan decided to resign from his position on 8 April 2015.

Police United
On 11 May 2015, around a month after the club head coach Attaphol Buspakom had died of sepsis, Police United of Division 1 announced the appointment of Totchtawan Sripan. He managed the club for the rest of the season. Police United won 2015 Thai Division 1 League and promoted to Thai Premier League. Totchtawan later left Police United due to the club financial crisis.

Muangthong United
On 21 January 2016, Muangthong United appointed Totchtawan Sripan as the club head coach. He is the first Thai head coach of the club after six years. Totchtawan made the official managerial debut on 2 February 2016 in AFC Champions League Preliminary Round 2 against Johor Darul Ta'zim from Malaysia. Muangthong won the match by the penalty shoot-out after the 0–0 draw at the end of extra-time. Muangthong United was knocked out of the AFC competition in the next round after lost 0–3 to Shanghai SIPG from China. Totchtawan Sripan eventually won a double, becoming champions of the Thai League and League Cup in his first season at Muangthong.

On 22 January 2017, Totchatawan guided Muangthong United to lift 2017 Thailand Champions Cup trophy with a 5–0 win over Sukhothai. His Muangthong United later lost 1–3 to Japanese club Sanfrecce Hiroshima in 2017 Toyota Premier Cup.

In 2017 AFC Champions League group stage, Totchtawan created the impressive run with Muangthong United by a point in the opening game against Brisbane Roar before the historic first win in the competition over Japanese J1 League champion Kashima Antlers at Supachalasai Stadium in the second match. His crews obtained another point from Ulsan Hyundai's home before the win in returning game at SCG Stadium. After six games, Muangthong is on the second of the group with 11 points pass through to knockout stage. In the end of seasons 2017, Totchtawan get Thai League 1 Coach of the Year award for the best performance in 2017 AFC Champions League.

On March 11, 2018. After shocked 1–6 away loss to PT Prachuap. He immediately resigns from Muangthong's managerial position, firstly not approved by the club, but later in mutual consent.

Managerial statistics

 A win or loss by the penalty shoot-out is counted as the draw in time.

International goals

Honours

Player
Thailand
 Sea Games: 1993, 1995, 1997, 1999
 ASEAN Football Championship: 1996, 2000, 2002
 Asian Games 4th: 1998, 2002
 King's Cup: 1994, 2000, 2006
 Independence Cup (Indonesia): 1994

Hoang Anh Gia Lai
 V-League: 2004
 Vietnamese Super Cup: 2004

Manager
BEC Tero Sasana
 Thai FA Cup runners-up; 2009
Saraburi
 Regional League Eastern Division: 2010
 Thai Division 1 runners-up: 2014 (promoted to 2015 Thai Premier League)
Police United
 Thai Division 1: 2015
Muangthong United
 Thai League 1: 2016
 Thai League Cup: 2016, 2017
 Thailand Champions Cup: 2017
 Mekong Club Championship: 2017
 Toyota Premier Cup runners-up: 2017

Individual
Thai League 1 Coach of the Year : 2016
Thai League 1 Coach of the Month : May 2016, November 2021

See also
 List of men's footballers with 100 or more international caps

References

External links

 A report of a May 2007 game against China

1971 births
Living people
Totchtawan Sripan
Totchtawan Sripan
Totchtawan Sripan
Totchtawan Sripan
Association football midfielders
2000 AFC Asian Cup players
2007 AFC Asian Cup players
Sembawang Rangers FC players
Totchtawan Sripan
Hoang Anh Gia Lai FC players
V.League 1 players
Totchtawan Sripan
Totchtawan Sripan
Totchtawan Sripan
Expatriate footballers in Vietnam
Totchtawan Sripan
Totchtawan Sripan
Totchtawan Sripan
Totchtawan Sripan
Expatriate footballers in Singapore
Singapore Premier League players
Footballers at the 1994 Asian Games
Footballers at the 1998 Asian Games
FIFA Century Club
Totchtawan Sripan
Southeast Asian Games medalists in football
Competitors at the 1993 Southeast Asian Games
Competitors at the 1995 Southeast Asian Games
Competitors at the 1997 Southeast Asian Games
Competitors at the 1999 Southeast Asian Games
Totchtawan Sripan
Thai expatriate sportspeople in Singapore
Thai expatriate sportspeople in Vietnam